Gol-e Cheydar Rural District is a rural district (dehestan) in Sarshiv District, Marivan County, Kurdistan Province, Iran. At the 2006 census, its population was 4,878, in 1,071 families. The rural district has 27 villages.

References 

Rural Districts of Kurdistan Province
Marivan County